Iunre (Yunre)  was an ancient Egyptian prince of the 4th Dynasty. He was the son of king Khafre. He was named after Ra.

Titles
His titles include:
 the King of Upper and Lower Egypt, Khafre, His Eldest Son of His Body
 Chief Ritualist of His Father, Scribe of the God's Book of His Father, Sole Confidant of His Father,
 Director of the Palace
 Guardian of the Secrets of the House of the Morning
 Priest of the Souls of Nekhen ..., High Priest
 Overseer of All the Works
 Honored by His Father, Secretary of His Father, He Who is in [the Heart] of His Father

Tomb
Iunre's tomb is G 8466, located in the Central Field which is part of the Giza Necropolis. The tomb is rockcut and the courtyard contains a life-size statue of a man. The courtyard also contains a shaft. An entrance leads one from the courtyard to the chapel which consists of just one rock cut room. Another burial shaft is located in the corner of this chapel. This shaft leads into a burial chamber. A large number of bodies were found in the burial chamber.

Sources

Princes of the Fourth Dynasty of Egypt
Khafre